The 2014 Sundance Film Festival took place from January 16, 2014 until January 26, 2014 in Park City, Utah, United States, with screenings in Salt Lake City, Ogden, and Sundance Resort in Utah. The festival opened with Whiplash directed by Damien Chazelle and closed with musical drama Rudderless directed by William H. Macy.

The festival honored late Roger Ebert and premiered Life Itself by Steve James, a biographical documentary film based on Ebert's 2011 memoir titled as Life Itself: A Memoir on 19 January 2014. The festival introduced a new film category titled Sundance Kids, which will help to introduce independent films to a younger generation of audiences. It is also a first category at the festival dedicated to children's films. The festival also hosted several events and discussion panels around themes of success through failure titled Free Fail, which included the screening of Bottle Rocket turned down by the Sundance Film Festival in 1996 and later become independently successful. The festival had more than 700 sponsors and 1,830 volunteers.

About the festival
A record 12,218 films were submitted, 72 more films than the 2013 festival. Of the 4,057-plus feature films were submitted, 2,014 were from the U.S. and 2,043 were international, and 121 were selected from 37 countries (with 100 of them being world premieres). Of the 8,161 short films submitted, 66 were selected (59 more than for the 2013 Festival). There were 54 directors, who made their directorial debut at the festival, 35 of whom have films in competition. Sixteen films were selected each for the U.S. Dramatic and U.S. Documentary competition sections, and twelve films each for the World Cinema Dramatic and World Cinema Documentary sections.

This year's festival marked the 30th anniversary of the festival since its foundation in 1981 by Robert Redford. In celebration of 30th anniversary of the festival, the screening of the most groundbreaking films of the past three decades took place at the festival. Some of the films which were shown are Beasts of the Southern Wild, Fruitvale Station, Little Miss Sunshine, An Education, Sex, Lies, and Videotape, Reservoir Dogs, The Cove, Hedwig and the Angry Inch, An Inconvenient Truth, Precious and Napoleon Dynamite. An Artist at the Table event was also hosted at the 30th anniversary of the festival, which was attended by Festival board members, patrons and artists visiting the festival including Mark Ruffalo, Katie Couric and Doug Aitken.

Music was major part of the festival. Most of the movies in the festival had musical themes. The opening night film Whiplash used music to explore human nature and identity. God Help the Girl, a coming of age drama with musical theme directed by Stuart Murdoch. Memphis starring musician Willis Earl Beal as an artist. Australian musician Flea appears in Low Down,  a biopic about American jazz pianist Joe Albany. Only Lovers Left Alive follows a musician and his lover while his world is collapsing down. Alive Inside: A Story of Music and Memory, a documentary about a man who wanted to help the Alzheimer's patient with music. Frank, comedy about a young musician, starring Michael Fassbender. 20,000 Days on Earth, a documentary narrating a day in the life of Nick Cave including cameos by Kylie Minogue and Ray Winstone. Also the closing night film of the festival Rudderless, told the story of a father who formed a rock and roll band to perform his late son's music.

Awards

The awards ceremony was held on January 26, 2014 at the Basin Recreation Fieldhouse in Park City, Utah, and was hosted by Nick Offerman and Megan Mullally.

 U.S. Grand Jury Prize: Documentary - Rich Hill
 U.S. Grand Jury Prize: Dramatic - Whiplash
 World Cinema Grand Jury Prize: Documentary - The Return to Homs
 World Cinema Grand Jury Prize: Dramatic - To Kill a Man
 Audience Award: U.S. Documentary - Alive Inside: A Story of Music and Memory
 Audience Award: U.S. Dramatic - Whiplash 
 Audience Award: World Cinema Documentary - The Green Prince
 Audience Award: World Cinema Dramatic - Difret
 Audience Award: Best of NEXT - Imperial Dreams
 Directing Award: U.S. Documentary - The Case Against 8
 Directing Award: U.S. Dramatic - Fishing Without Nets 
 Directing Award: World Cinema Documentary - 20,000 Days on Earth 
 Directing Award: World Cinema Dramatic - 52 Tuesdays
 Waldo Salt Screenwriting Award: U.S. Dramatic - The Skeleton Twins
 Screenwriting Award: World Cinema Dramatic - Blind
 Editing Award: U.S. Documentary - Watchers of the Sky
 Editing Award: World Cinema Documentary - 20,000 Days on Earth
 Cinematography Award: U.S. Documentary - E-Team
 Cinematography Award: U.S. Dramatic - Low Down
 Cinematography Award: World Cinema Documentary - Happiness
 Cinematography Award: World Cinema Dramatic - Lilting
 U.S. Documentary Special Jury Award for Achievement for Use of Animation - Watchers of the Sky
 U.S. Documentary Special Jury Award for Achievement for Intuitive Filmmaking - The Overnighters
 U.S. Dramatic Special Jury Award for Musical Score - The Octopus Project for Kumiko, the Treasure Hunter
 U.S. Dramatic Special Jury Award for Breakthrough Talent - Justin Simien for Dear White People
 World Cinema Dramatic Special Jury Award - God Help the Girl
 World Cinema Documentary Special Jury Award for Cinematic Bravery - We Come as Friends
 Short Film Audience Award - Chapel Perilous
 Alfred P. Sloan Feature Film Prize - I Origins

Additional awards were presented at separate ceremonies. The Shorts Awards were presented January 21, 2014 at the ceremony in Park City, Utah.

 Short Film Grand Jury Prize - Of God and Dogs
 Short Film Jury Award: U.S. Fiction - Gregory Go Boom
 Short Film Jury Award: International Fiction - The Cut, Geneviève Dulude-De Celles
 Short Film Jury Award: Non-fiction - I Think This Is the Closest to How the Footage Looked
 Short Film Jury Award: Animation - Yearbook
 Short Film Special Jury Award for Unique Vision - Rat Pack Rat
 Short Film Special Jury Award for Direction and Ensemble Acting - Burger
 Short Film Special Special Jury Award for Non-fiction - Love. Love. Love.
 Sundance Institute/Mahindra Global Filmmaking Awards -  Hong Khaou for Monsoon, Tobias Lindholm for A War, Ashlee Page for Archive and Neeraj Ghaywan for Fly Away Solo.
 Sundance Institute/NHK Filmmaker Award - Mark Elijah Rosenberg for Ad Inexplorata
 Hilton Worldwide LightStay Sustainability Award - Ben Kalina for Shored Up (and $25,000 grant)
 2014 Red Crown Producer's Award - Elisabeth Holm for Obvious Child (and $10,000 grant)

Juries
Jury members, for the U.S. Documentary Jury, were announced on December 18, 2013. The rest of the jury members including the Alfred P. Sloan Jury, which will also take part in the Science in Film Forum Panel, were announced on January 9, 2014. Presenters of awards are followed by asterisks:

U.S. Documentary Jury
Tracy Chapman*
Charlotte Cook*
Kahane Cooperman*
Morgan Neville*
Jonathan Oppenheim*

U.S. Dramatic Jury
Leonard Maltin*
Peter Saraf*
Lone Scherfig*
Bryan Singer
Dana Stevens*

World Documentary Jury
Andrea Nix Fine*
Sally Riley*
Caspar Sonnen*

World Dramatic Jury
Carlo Chatrian*
Sebastián Lelio*
Nansun Shi*

Alfred P. Sloan Jury
Dr. Kevin Hand
Flora Lichtman
Max Mayer
Jon Spaihts
Jill Tarter

Short Film Jury
Vernon Chatman*
Joshua Leonard*
Ania Trzebiatowska*

Others who presented awards included Felicity Huffman, William H. Macy and Nick Offerman.

Films
For a full list of films appeared at the festival, see List of films at the 2014 Sundance Film Festival.

Festival theaters
The number of seats available at the festival theaters, where films were shown is listed below:

Park City
Eccles Theatre - 1,270 seats
Egyptian Theatre - 282 seats
Holiday Village Cinema 1 - 162 seats
Holiday Village Cinema 2 - 154 seats
Holiday Village Cinema 2 - 154 seats
Holiday Village Cinema 4 - 162 seats
Library Center Theatre - 486 seats
The MARC Theatre - 550 seats
Prospector Square Theatre - 324 seats
Redstone Cinema 1 - 188 seats
Redstone Cinema 2 - 175 seats
Redstone Cinema 7 - 176 seats
Temple Theatre - 318 seats
Yarrow Hotel Theatre - 295 seats

Salt Lake City
Broadway Cinema 3 - 243 seats
Broadway Cinema 6 - 245 seats
Rose Wagner Performing Arts Center - 495 seats
SLC Library - 300 seats
Tower Theatre - 349 seats

Sundance Resort
Sundance Resort Screening Room - 164 seats

Ogden
Peery's Egyptian Theatre - 840 seats

Sundance Film Festival U.S.A.
In late January, 2014 the festival sent 9 filmmakers to 9 cities across the US to screen and discuss their films. The cities and films are:

Ann Arbor, Michigan at Michigan Theater - Infinitely Polar Bear
Boston, Massachusetts at Coolidge Corner Theatre - WHITEY: United States of America v. James J. Bulger
Chicago, Illinois at Music Box Theatre - Happy Christmas
Houston, Texas at Sundance Cinemas Houston - Cold in July
Nashville, Tennessee at The Belcourt Theatre - Low Down
Orlando, Florida at Enzian Theater - Little Accidents
San Francisco, California at Sundance Kabuki Cinemas - Camp X-Ray
Seattle, Washington at Sundance Cinemas Seattle - The Skeleton Twins
Tucson, Arizona at The Loft - Young Ones

Acquisitions
Acquisitions at the festival included the following:

Domestic Rights
CNN Films and Lionsgate
Dinosaur 13
Focus Features
Wish I Was Here
Participant Media
Cesar's Last Fast
A24
Laggies
Obvious Child 
Lionsgate
Cooties
Lionsgate and Roadside Attractions
The Skeleton Twins 
IFC Films
God's Pocket
IBC Films
Cold in July
Fox Searchlight Pictures
Calvary
Sony Pictures Classics
Love Is Strange
Whiplash
iTunes
Sepideh – Reaching for the Stars
Netflix
Mitt
RADiUS-TWC
Fed Up
Samuel Goldwyn Films
Ivory Tower
Drafthouse Films
The Overnighters
The Orchard and Independent Lens
Rich Hill
Music Box Films
Watchers of the Sky
Participant Media and FilmBuff
The Internet's Own Boy: The Story of Aaron Swartz
Drafthouse
20,000 Days on Earth

International Rights
Sony Pictures Worldwide
Whiplash
Magnolia Pictures and Paramount Pictures
Happy Christmas
Fox Searchlight Pictures
I Origins
Sony Pictures Worldwide
The Skeleton Twins
Sony Pictures Classics
Land Ho!
RADiUS-TWC
The One I Love
Sony Pictures Classics and Pretty Pictures
Love Is Strange
Paramount Pictures
Ivory Tower

References

External links

Festival webpage 

2014
2014 film festivals
2014 in Utah
2014 in American cinema
2014 festivals in the United States
January 2014 events in the United States